The Vintage Flying Museum is a non-profit aviation museum located at Meacham International Airport, Fort Worth, Texas. The primary mission of the museum is to preserve America's flying heritage in word, deed and action. Also located at the museum is Greatest Generation Aircraft, the Invader Squadron of the Commemorative Air Force, the Fort Worth Chapter of the American Rosie the Riveter Association and PGM Aviation.

History
The museum was founded in 1988 when William "Doc" Hospers bought a B-17.

In October 2010, the museum sold its B-17, "Chuckie", to the Military Aviation Museum in Virginia Beach, Virginia.

In 2019, the museum acquired a Beech 18 that was previously owned by Jackie Cochrane.

Programs
The museum provides educational programs that include aviation summer camps for middle and high school students, and Take Flight Days, which are programs for elementary school students.

Aircraft on display
The museum's collection includes:

 Aeronca 11 Chief
 Aeronca L-3B
 American Flea
 Beechcraft E18S
 Beechcraft TC-45G Expeditor
 Boeing-Stearman PT-27
 Cessna 140
 Cessna U-3
 Culver Cadet LFA-90
 Douglas B-26K Counter Invader
 Douglas C-49J
 Douglas EA-3B Skywarrior – on loan
 Knight Falcon
 Lockheed T-33
 LTV L450F
 Morrissey 2000
 North American F-86F Sabre
 North American Harvard III
 Piasecki CH-21B Workhorse – on loan
 Piaggio P.136 Royal Gull
 Ryan PT-22 Recruit
 Stinson L-5E Sentinel – on loan
 Stinson Reliant

The museum also hosts aircraft from the B-29/B-24 and Invader Squadrons of the Commemorative Air Force when they are not out touring the country:
 Boeing B-29 Superfortress "Fifi"
 Douglas A-26 Invader

See also
 Commemorative Air Force
 Fort Worth Aviation Museum

References

External links

Aerospace museums in Texas
Museums established in 1993
Museums in Fort Worth, Texas